Stray Kids (often abbreviated as SKZ) is a South Korean boy band formed by JYP Entertainment through the 2017 reality show of the same name. The group is composed of eight members: Bang Chan, Lee Know, Changbin, Hyunjin, Han, Felix, Seungmin, and I.N. Originally a nine-piece group, member Woojin left due to undisclosed personal reasons in October 2019.

Stray Kids released their pre-debut extended play (EP) Mixtape in January 2018 and officially debuted on March 25 with the EP I Am Not, followed by other two I Am series EPs, I Am Who and I Am You. Their Clé trilogy EPs were issued in 2019, consisting of Clé 1: Miroh, Clé 2: Yellow Wood, and Clé: Levanter. The group's first studio album Go Live was released in 2020, becoming their first platinum-certified album by Korea Music Content Association (KMCA). That year, Stray Kids also made their Japanese debut with the compilation album SKZ2020 through Epic Records Japan.

In 2021, Stray Kids' second studio album Noeasy became their first million-selling album. After signing with Republic Records for promotions in the United States in 2022, the group released the EPs Oddinary and Maxident, which marked their first appearances atop the US Billboard 200 and on the UK Albums Chart. Maxident was certified triple-million in album sales by the KMCA, making them just the second group to achieve this in Korean history. As of October 2022, Stray Kids has sold over 10 million albums across both Korean and Japanese releases.

Name

The group's name "Stray Kids" was not defined by JYP Entertainment but conceptualized by the members themselves. It originally referred to a lost child who wants to chase their dreams and later evolved to represent the idea of finding a way together out of the ordinary.

History

2017–2018: Formation, debut and I Am series
In August 2017, JYP Entertainment (JYPE) officially announced their new reality survival show with the goal of launching a male idol debut project. More details and teasers were released in the next two months, including the show's title, Stray Kids. Prior to its premiere on October 17, JYPE released Stray Kids' first music video for a song titled "Hellevator", which was later released as a digital single. Two members, Lee Know and Felix, were initially eliminated from the group but returned to the final nine-member line-up.

Along with the launch of Stray Kids' official website, JYPE announced the release of the group's pre-debut extended play (EP) titled Mixtape. It contains seven tracks co-written and co-composed by the members, including "Hellevator" and other songs that they performed on the show. The EP, along with the performance video of its second track "Beware", was released on January 8, 2018, while the performance video of "Spread My Wings" was uploaded online a week later. It debuted at number two on the Gaon Album Chart and Billboard World Albums chart.

On March 25, the group held their debut showcase of the group, Stray Kids Unveil (Op. 01: I Am Not), at Jangchung Arena. They officially debuted the next day with the release of their EP titled I Am Not, along with the music video of its title track "District 9", while the music video of "Grow Up" and performance video of "Mirror" were released on March 31 and April 23, respectively. I Am Not debuted at number four on the Gaon Album Chart and sold over 54,000 physical copies in March.

On April 14, Stray Kids performed at KCON Japan 2018, the group's first overseas performance. On July 12, JYPE announced the group's second showcase, Stray Kids Unveil (Op. 02: I Am Who), for August 5 at Kyung Hee University's Grand Peace Palace. Their second EP, I Am Who, was released the next day along with lead single "My Pace". On October 4, JYPE announced the group's third showcase, Stray Kids Unveil (Op. 03: I Am You), for October 21 at Olympic Hall. The performance was followed by the release of their new EP I Am You the day afterward.

2019: Clé series and Woojin's departure 

Stray Kids began the year by bringing their showcase tour, the Unveil Tour "I Am...", to the Asia-Pacific, starting on January 19 in Bangkok. The group also held their national promotional Hi Stay Tour in Busan, Daejeon and Incheon in March, as well as a finale in Seoul in Olympic Park on April 20. On March 5, JYPE announced Stray Kids would make their third comeback on March 25, 2019, with the release of their fourth EP Clé 1: Miroh in commemoration of the first anniversary of the group's debut. The group earned their first music show win on April 4 on M Countdown for the album's lead single, "Miroh." On June 19, they released their first special album Clé 2: Yellow Wood, along with lead single "Side Effects", between the American and European legs of their first world tour.

Stray Kids released a digital single titled "Double Knot" on October 9 and announced their District 9 Unlock World Tour, beginning with shows at Olympic Hall in Seoul, South Korea from November 23–24. Their fifth EP Clé: Levanter was initially scheduled for a November 25 release; however, on October 28, JYPE announced that Woojin had left the group due to personal circumstances, and the release date would therefore be postponed. On November 13, the group released the music video for "Astronaut," their first single as an eight-member group, followed by Cle: Levanter on December 9. Stray Kids held the Japanese shows for the Hi Stay Tour on December 19 at Yoyogi National Gymnasium, Tokyo with an audience of 8,000 people. The group released the digital single "Mixtape: Gone Days", the first single of their Mixtape Project, on December 26.

2020: Japanese debut, 生 series and All In 

Stray Kids released the first English versions of "Double Knot" and "Levanter" as digital singles together titled Step Out of Clé, along with a performance video of the English version of "Double Knot" on January 24. They officially debuted in Japan on March 18 with compilation album SKZ2020, which contained new recordings of previous songs and included Japanese versions of "My Pace", "Double Knot" and "Levanter", through Epic Records Japan. The group released the second Mixtape Project digital single "Mixtape: On Track" on March 26. On June 3, Stray Kids released their first Japanese single, "Top", and its B-side "Slump". The former was used as the theme song for the anime Tower of God, and the latter as it's ending theme; a Korean version was released on May 13, and an English version on May 20. The single debuted atop Oricon Singles Chart, making them the fourth foreign male artist in history to debut at number one on the chart with their first single, after Jang Keun-suk, Exo, and iKon.

On June 17, Stray Kids released their first studio album Go Live alongside lead single "God's Menu", including on the tracklist the Korean versions of "Top" and "Slump" and previously released singles “Gone Days" and "On Track". Go Live became the group's best-selling album at the time, debuting atop the weekly Gaon Album Chart and selling 243,462 copies by the end of the month to reach number five on the monthly Gaon Album Chart. The album was certified platinum by the Korea Music Content Association (KMCA) in August 2020, the group's first album to achieve this. "God's Menu" became the group's first single to appear on the weekly Gaon Download Chart, debuting at number 144. Three months later, the group reissued their first studio album as In Life on September 14. During promotions, the group received two music show wins: once on MBC M's Show Champion and once on Mnet's M Countdown. Lead single "Back Door" was recognized by Time magazine at eighth on its list of the 10 Best Songs of 2020, the only song by a Korean act on the list, and described as "an artful Frankenstein that’s as catchy as it is complex".

On November 4, Stray Kids released their first Japanese EP, All In, with title track "All In" serving as lead single. The EP also included Japanese versions of "God's Menu" and "Back Door", as well as their first Japanese single "Top". On November 22, the group held their first online concert, titled "Unlock: Go Live In Life", via Beyond Live, which was considered a continuation of their "District 9: Unlock" Tour that faced postponement and cancellation due to concerns over the COVID-19 pandemic. During the concert, the group performed the Korean version of their song "All In" for the first time, which was eventually released on November 26 as a digital single.

2021: Kingdom: Legendary War and Noeasy

At the 2020 Mnet Asian Music Awards, it was announced that Stray Kids would be joining Ateez and The Boyz on the inaugural season of Kingdom: Legendary War, a Mnet boy group competition show; BtoB, iKon and SF9 were later confirmed as participants as well. On May 28, 2021, the group released a song for the final round of the competition titled "Wolfgang", which marked the group's first appearance on the main Gaon Digital Chart, at number 138. They won the program on June 3, earning them their own reality show and a Kingdom Week special show for their comeback.

Stray Kids held their first official fan meeting, Stray Kids 1st #LoveStay 'SKZ-X' on February 20, 2021, via V Live and their first Japanese fan meeting—STAYing Home Meeting—for the first anniversary of their Japanese debut on March 18. The group collaborated with Swedish producer Alesso and Chinese DJ Corsak on the Korean version of the song "Going Dumb" for the mobile game version of PUBG, released on March 19. The song debuted at number 13 on Billboard Hot Dance/Electronic Songs, the group's first appearance on the chart.

Stray Kids surprise-released the third single for their Mixtape Project, "Mixtape: Oh", on June 26. It debuted atop Billboard World Digital Song Sales, their first number one on the chart. The group released their second studio album Noeasy on August 23. It debuted atop Gaon Album Chart, selling over 1.1 million copies as of August 2021 and certified million by the KMCA, making them first act under JYP Entertainment to sell more than one million copies of an album. Lead single "Thunderous" peaked at number 33 on Gaon Digital Chart and number 80 on Billboard Global 200 and earned six wins on music programs. The accompanying music video on YouTube reached 100 million views in 55 days after release, the group's fifth and fastest video to reach this mark.

The group released their second Japanese single "Scars"/"Thunderous (Japanese ver.)" on October 13. The single entered at number two on both Oricon Singles Chart and Billboard Japan Hot 100, selling over 180,000 CD copies. A Christmas-themed "special holiday" single album titled Christmas EveL was released on November 29, featuring both the title track and "Winter Falls" as lead singles. It peaked atop Gaon Album Chart, selling over 743,000 copies in 2021 alone, and was certified double platinum by KMCA. The group concluded the year with the digital release of SKZ2021, a compilation album including re-recorded versions of previous songs and the Korean version of "Scars", on December 23.

2022: Oddinary, Circus and Maxident 
On February 10, 2022, it was announced that Stray Kids signed with Republic Records for promotions in the United States as part of JYPE's strategic partnership with the label, alongside labelmate Itzy. The group held their second fan meeting 2nd #LoveStay 'SKZ's Chocolate Factory' from February 12–13 at Olympic Hall; the second day was also broadcast via Beyond Live. Stray Kids released their sixth EP Oddinary on March 18. The EP topped charts in South Korea, Finland, Poland, and the United States, selling over 1.5 million copies in March. It became Stray Kids' first album to appear on the UK Albums Chart, and Billboard 200. The latter made them the third Korean act in history to top the chart, after BTS and SuperM. Its lead single "Maniac became the group's first song to chart the UK Singles Chart at number 98, and the Bubbling Under Hot 100 at number 19, among others.

In support of Oddinary, Stray Kids announced their second concert tour, the Maniac World Tour, which began on April 29 in Seoul, South Korea, followed by shows in Asia, Australia, and North America. It concluded at Los Angeles on April 2, 2023. On June 22, Stray Kids released their second Japanese EP, Circus, preceded by the Japanese version of "Maniac", the new song "Your Eyes", and the title track. The EP debuted at number two on the Oricon Albums Chart and atop Billboard Japan Hot Albums. The group surprise-released the single "Mixtape: Time Out" on August 1 to celebrate their fourth anniversary of revealing the fandom's name Stay.

Prior to the upcoming release, Stray Kids released "Heyday", performed by 3Racha, for Street Man Fighter's Mega Crew Mission. The group's seventh EP, Maxident, was released on October 7, with lead single "Case 143". The EP debuted atop in South Korea, Poland, and the United States. It became their second consecutive number-one album in the US and the fourth South Korean and non-English album to top the chart. Maxident became Stray Kids and JYPE's first album to sell over two and three million copies and be certified triple million by KMCA. They released the third compilation album SKZ-Replay on December 21, containing solo tracks by the members and songs previously unofficially released as video uploads. The International Federation of the Phonographic Industry (IFPI) ranked Stray Kids as the seventh best-selling artist of 2022. Maxident and Oddinary were the sixth and fourteenth best-selling albums of 2022.

2023–present: The Sound 
Stray Kids' debut Japanese-language studio album, titled The Sound, was released on February 22, 2023. The group will headline the music festival Lollapalooza in Paris for the first time as a K-pop artist in French music festival, scheduled to perform on July 21, 2023.

Artistry

Stray Kids' music is generally K-pop, hip hop, and electronic. They are considered a "self-producing" idol group as the members are almost always involved in songwriting and composing and sometimes assist in arranging. Since the release of "God's Menu" in 2020, Stray Kids' discography has also been described as being of a unique "mala taste genre" and "noise music", a label that inspired their album Noeasy.

Endorsements
In February 2018, before Stray Kids' official debut, the nine members were announced as new models for Jambangee Jeans for their spring collection. In June, they were selected as an exclusive models for Ivy Club for the 2018 fall semester. The next month, Stray Kids partnered with Minute Maid Sparkling and were selected as promotional models for CGV "Youth Brand Festival" five days later. On September 19, Stray Kids began endorsing Lotte Duty Free, and on October 16, Stray Kids became new models for the Korean sportswear brand Pro-Specs. In June 2019, Stray Kids was chosen as the newest ambassador of Talk Talk Korea Contest, and on June 18, they were appointed as honorary ambassadors by the Korean Culture and Information Service, Ministry of Culture, Sports and Tourism.

In November 2020, Stray Kids was chosen to become Shopee Indonesia's brand ambassador for the 11.11 Big Sale and 12.12 Birthday Sale. On February 1, 2021, Stray Kids was chosen to become new models for Clio Cosmetics. In June 2021, the group was chosen to become endorse the Japanese clothing brand Wego and as ambassadors for the Korea Pavilion of Expo 2020 Dubai. In September, the group was chosen to become new models for the cosmetic brand Nacific, and the group's sub-unit Danceracha (Lee Know, Hyunjin, and Felix) appeared in campaigns for Italian brand Etro's unisex Earthbeat sneaker.

In 2022, Stray Kids became muses for the clothing brand Mahagrid's 2022 Summer T-shirt Campaign, as well as ambassadors for Philippine clothing brand Bench. The brand held a fan meeting on January 20, 2023, at the SM Mall of Asia Arena. The group served as models for Lotte Duty Free again in September 2022, together with Super Junior.

Members
On October 28, 2019, Woojin left Stray Kids and terminated his contract with JYP Entertainment for undisclosed personal reasons. From February to July 2021, Hyunjin was on hiatus due to bullying allegations against him but resumed regular activities with the group in August.

Current members
 Bang Chan – leader, vocalist, rapper, dancer, producer
 Lee Know – dancer, vocalist
 Changbin – rapper, producer
 Hyunjin – dancer, rapper
 Han – rapper, vocalist, producer
 Felix – dancer, rapper
 Seungmin – vocalist
 I.N – vocalist

Former members
 Woojin – vocalist (2017–2019)

Notes
Bang Chan, Changbin, and Han are also members of the in-house songwriting and production trio 3Racha. All three compose lyrics and music for the group and are credited as the first three songwriters on most releases; Bang Chan has also participated in arrangements.

Timeline

Discography

Korean albums
Go Live (2020)
Noeasy (2021)

Japanese albums
The Sound (2023)

Filmography

Television series

Concert tours

 District 9: Unlock World Tour (2019–2020)
 Maniac World Tour (2022–2023)

Awards and nominations

References

External links

  
  

 
2017 establishments in South Korea
English-language singers from South Korea
Japanese-language singers of South Korea
JYP Entertainment artists
K-pop music groups
MAMA Award winners
Musical groups established in 2017
Musical groups from Seoul
Republic Records artists
Sony Music Entertainment Japan artists
South Korean boy bands
South Korean dance music groups
South Korean hip hop groups
South Korean pop music groups